In Scots law, the Crown Matrimonial is a person's right to co-reign equally with his or her spouse.

The Crown Matrimonial of Scotland was sought by King Francis II of France, husband of Mary, Queen of Scots, by the Parliament of Scotland and Mary's mother, Mary of Guise, who was regent of Scotland. It would make Francis legal co-sovereign of Scotland with Queen Mary, and would also grant Francis the right to keep the Scottish throne if he outlived her. By the terms of the offer, he would be able to pass the Scottish crown to his descendants by a wife other than Mary. The Crown of Scotland was to be sent to France, where it was supposed to be kept at the Abbey of Saint Denis. However, the offer was never realised, as the Hamilton family, who were close to the throne, joined the Protestants and opposed it.

Mary's second husband, Henry Stuart, Lord Darnley, also demanded the Crown Matrimonial. The Protestant peers promised to make him sovereign by the consent of Parliament. They agreed that Henry, as the new sovereign, would pardon all the exiled Protestants and allow them to return to Scotland. However, the plan was never realised.

See also
Jure uxoris
King consort
Clan Hamilton

References 

Scottish monarchy
16th century in Scotland
Legal history of Scotland
Gender equality
Mary, Queen of Scots
Parliament of Scotland
Sovereignty
Scottish Reformation
Political history of Scotland
Constitutional laws of Scotland
Inheritance